Midlaren is a village in the Dutch province of Drenthe. It is a part of the municipality of Tynaarlo, and lies about 14 km southeast of Groningen.

History 
The village was first mentioned between 1298 and 1304 as "in Middelare". Mid (middle) has been added to distinguish between Noordlaren and Zuidlaren. In the 12th century, "tribus Laribus" was recorded which means "the three Larens". "Laar" means "open forest". Midlaren is an esdorp without a church which developed in the Early Middle Ages. There are remains of two brinks (village squares).

Midlaren was home to 73 people in 1840. Pavilion De Bloemert was built in 1935 in functionalist style in reinforced concrete. The summer residence Villa Meerwijk was destroyed by fire in 1945 and only the park remains.

Dolmen 
They are near complete: all the capstones are present and only two side stones are missing. They have never been restored, however some cracks have been filled in with concrete. They are photogenic dolmen due to the nearby farms and the oak trees which overshadow the stones.

Gallery

References

Populated places in Drenthe
Tynaarlo